Bani Yousef  is a sub-district located in the Al Haymah Ad Dakhiliyah District, Sana'a Governorate, Yemen. Bani Yousef  had a population of 6743 according to the 2004 census.

References 

Sub-districts in Al Haymah Ad Dakhiliyah District